Chashme Baddoor is a Hindi language soap opera that aired on Zee TV channel in 1998. The series was produced by Manish Goswami. The story is based on the life of a woman who had a splendid teenage life and an equally contrasting middle age life and who does not know how to deal with it.

Cast
 Sudha Chandran
 Naveen Bawa
 Ajay Nagrath
 Kashmera Shah
 Sadiya Siddiqui
 Rushali Arora
 Susheel Johari
 Moonmoon Banerjee as Shanta
 Jatin Kanakia as Chaturdas Chaurasia
 Anil Nagrath

External links
 Chashme Baddoor Official Site

Indian television soap operas
Zee TV original programming
1998 Indian television series debuts
1999 Indian television series endings